The French ironclad Invincible was the second of the three wooden-hulled s built for the French Navy in 1858–1862. The ships of the Gloire class were classified as armoured frigates because they only had a single gun deck and their traditional disposition of guns arrayed along the length of the hull also meant that they were broadside ironclads. Invincible had an uneventful career and was deployed in North American waters during the Franco-Prussian War of 1870–71. The unseasoned timber of her hull rotted quickly and she was condemned in 1872 and scrapped in 1876.

Design and description
Designed by the French naval architect Henri Dupuy de Lôme, the ships of the class were intended to fight in the line of battle, unlike the first British ironclads. She had a crew of 570 officers and enlisted men.

Invincible had a single horizontal return connecting-rod compound steam engine that drove one propeller. On sea trials, Invincible reached .

The Gloire-class ships were armed with 36 Modèle 1858  rifled muzzle-loading guns, 34 of which were positioned on the single gun deck in the broadside. The remaining two guns were placed on the upper deck as chase guns. They fired a  shell at a muzzle velocity of only  and proved to be ineffective against armour. They were replaced by rifled breech-loading Modèle 1864 guns in 1868. Six  guns were mounted in the centre of the gun deck and a pair of  guns replaced the original chase guns.

Construction and service
Ordered on 4 March 1858, Invincible was laid down at the Arsenal de Toulon on 1 May 1858, launched on 4 April 1861 and completed in March 1862. In September–October 1863, she conducted tactical trials with other ironclads. While assigned to the Mediterranean Fleet, the ship made a port visit in August 1865 to Brest where the fleet hosted the British Channel Fleet. As part of the festivities, Invincible put on a banquet for the midshipmen of both fleets that was reportedly the noisiest and most enjoyable of the visit. A few days later the French fleet made a reciprocal visit to Portsmouth where it was hosted by the Channel Fleet. During the Franco-Prussian War of 1870–71, the ship was sent to defend the islands of Saint Pierre and Miquelon from Prussian commerce raiders. Built of unseasoned timber, Invincible was in poor shape upon her return and was decommissioned. Condemned on 12 August 1872, the ship was scrapped in 1876 at Cherbourg.

Notes

Footnotes

References

 

 

Ships built in France
1861 ships
Gloire-class ironclads